The Holderness Baronetcy, of Tadworth in the County of Surrey, is a title in the Baronetage of the United Kingdom. It was created on 16 February 1920 for Sir Thomas Holderness, GCB, KCSI, Permanent Under-Secretary of State for India from 1912 to 1920.

Holderness baronets, of Tadworth (1920)
Sir Thomas William Holderness, 1st Baronet (1849–1924)
Sir Ernest William Elsmie Holderness, 2nd Baronet (1890–1968)
Sir Richard William Holderness, 3rd Baronet (1927–1998)
Sir Martin William Holderness, 4th Baronet (born 1957)
Matthew William Thornton Holderness (born 1990) heir apparent

References

Kidd, Charles, Williamson, David (editors). Debrett's Peerage and Baronetage (1990 edition). New York: St Martin's Press, 1990, 

Holderness